Brzeziński (feminine: Brzezińska, plural: Brzezińscy) is a Polish surname.

History
The surname is derived from the root word "brzoza" ("brzez-" in some compound words), meaning "birch". The adjective suffix "ski" means "being like" or "belonging to", so Brzeziński  refers to a person from one of the localities named for a concentration of birch trees, such as Brzezina, (a small village in Western Pomerania). In Polish, Brzeziński has a diacritic over the letter "ń", and the Polish pronunciation is "bzhe-ZEEGN-ski" (where GN sounds like the NI of "onion").

The Brzeziński surname was originally borne only by the szlachta, the Polish noble class, who took their names from their estates, but it later spread to the working and peasant classes as well.  It is known to be associated with at least nine different coats of arms:

Dołęga coat of arms (originating in eastern Poland)
Doliwa coat of arms (originating in Łęczyca)
Gryf coat of arms (borne by the two Brzeziński families ennobled by the Tsar in his role as "King of Poland" in the 19th century) 
Kościesza coat of arms 
Łabędź coat of arms (originating in Sandomierz)
Lubicz coat of arms (originating in Płock)
Prus III coat of arms 
Trąby coat of arms (originating in Kraków)
Zabawa coat of arms

There were 25,361 persons with the name Brzeziński in Poland in 1990. The name has been borne by many notable Poles and persons of Polish descent, including:

People

In Poland
Anna Brzezińska (disambiguation), several people
Anton Brzeziński, Polish artist
Ewelina Brzezińska (born 1988), Polish volleyball player
Franciszek Brzeziński, Polish composer
Jerzy Marian Brzeziński, Polish psychologist, methodologist
Józef Piotr Brzeziński, Polish biologist
Marcin Brzeziński (born 1984), Polish rower
Mieczysław Brzeziński, Polish naturalist
Piotr Brzeziński, Polish lawyer
Stefan Julian Brzeziński, Polish education activist, engineer
Tadeusz Brzeziński (1896–1990), Polish diplomat and soldier
Tadeusz Brzeziński (physician), Polish physician
Wacław Brzeziński (1878–1955), Polish baritone singer

In other countries
Emilie Benes Brzezinski (born 1932), American sculptor, wife of Zbigniew Brzezinski
Ian Brzezinski (born 1963), American foreign policy and defense expert, son of Zbigniew Brzezinski
Lech Brzezinski, Canadian engineering executive, son of Tadeusz Brzeziński
Mark Brzezinski (born 1965), American lawyer and diplomat, son of Zbigniew Brzezinski
Matthew Brzezinski (born 1965), author and journalist, son of Lech Brzeziński
Michael August Brzezinski, American chemist
Mika Brzezinski, American TV news anchor, daughter of Zbigniew Brzezinski
Richard Brzezinski, military historian
Rob Brzezinski, Vice President of Football Operations for the Minnesota VIkings
Zbigniew Brzezinski (1928–2017) American foreign policy expert, son of Tadeusz Brzeziński

See also
 
 

Polish-language surnames